The Royal House of the Post Office (Spanish: Real Casa de Correos) is an eighteenth century building in Puerta del Sol, Madrid. It was built for the postal service, but currently serves as the office of the President of the Community of Madrid, the head of the regional government of the Autonomous Community of Madrid. This should not to be confused with the City Council of Madrid, which is housed in another former post office, the Cybele Palace.

History

In the 17th century there were some thirty two-storey houses in the area currently occupied by the Royal House of the Post Office. 
In the 1750s the area was cleared as part of the development of the Puerta del Sol square. A plan for a head post office was produced by the Spanish architect Ventura Rodríguez. However, Ventura Rodríguez, who enjoyed the patronage of Ferdinand VI, lost favour when Charles III came to the throne in 1760.
The House of the Post Office was designed by French architect Jacques Marquet.
Work on the building began in the late 1760s.

For a time, a tower on the roof was the terminal of one of the optical telegraphy lines of Spain.

The building was the headquarters of the Ministry of Interior and State Security in Francoist Spain.
Dissidents to the regime were afraid of being taken to the basement of the DGS, where they might be subjected to torture.

Clock tower

On top of the building is a clock inaugurated in 1866 by Queen Isabel II. Its time ball and bells traditionally mark the eating of the Twelve Grapes and the beginning of a new year in most of Spain (the Canary Islands are in a different time zone). These celebrations have been broadcast live on major Spanish television networks including Televisión Española since 1962.

Km 0

A plate on the ground in front of the building marks the kilometer 0 of the streets of Madrid and the Spanish roads.

References

External links

Clock towers in Spain
Former post office buildings
Buildings and structures in Sol neighborhood, Madrid
Time balls
Government of the Community of Madrid
Francoist Spain
Tourist attractions in Madrid
Post office buildings in Spain